The Subcommittee on Rural Development, Energy, and Supply Chains is one of five subcommittees of the House Small Business Committee. It has previously been known as Subcommittee on Rural Development, Agriculture, Trade and Entrepreneurship and Subcommittee on Agriculture, Energy and Trade, and the Subcommittee on Underserved, Agricultural, and Rural Business Development.

Members, 117th Congress

Historical membership rosters

115th Congress

Reference:

116th Congress

References

External links
House Committee on Small Business
House Small Business Committee Subcommittee members
 

Small Business Underserved